Eileen Kramer (born 8 November 1914) is an Australian dancer, artist, performer, and choreographer. Kramer began by studying singing and music in Sydney in the 1930s, but after attending a performance of the Bodenwieser Ballet in 1940, immediately decided on a career change to dance. After joining the troupe that had made such an impression on her, she toured around Australia and overseas for the next decade. She then lived and worked in France and the US for the next 60 years, before returning to Australia where she remains active in the arts .

Early life
Eileen Kramer was born and grew up in Mosman Bay with one other sibling, a brother. Her father, a car salesman, began showing signs of alcoholism when Kramer was about 10, leading to her mother leaving and secretly relocating with the children to Coogee when she was 13. Her mother then began working as a store detective at Farmers (now owned by Myer), a department store on George Street.

In 1936, when her mother remarried, Kramer left home and lived in a shared cottage on Philip Street until 1940 and studied singing at the Sydney Conservatorium of Music. To support herself, she worked as an usherette and an artist's model, at one time posing for Norman Lindsay. In 1940, her mother took her to a charity concert which included The Blue Danube, performed by Gertrud Bodenwieser's dance company. The next day, Kramer sought out Bodenwieser, and after successfully auditioning and completing three years of training, she joined Bodenwieser’s main troupe and began her career in professional dance.

Career
Kramer toured Australia with the Bodenwieser Ballet for the next 10 years. The group also toured internationally post-war to France, New Zealand, South Africa, and India. After leaving the troupe in 1953, she travelled to India, then lived and worked in Paris as an artist's model, often for Andre Lhote and his studio. It was here in 1957, aged 42, that she met an Israeli-American film-maker named Baruch Shadmi. The two collaborated on a mixed animated and live-action film for which she hand-made over 400 figures. At a casino in Dieppe, while Shadmi played roulette, she met Louis Armstrong and he taught her to do The Twist. While working on their film in the mid-1960s, Shadmi suffered a stroke, and Kramer effectively put her dance career on hold for 18 years while caring for him in New York. He died in 1987. In 1988, Kramer resumed her career and moved to Hinton to live with an old stage friend, before moving to Lewisburg in 1992. It was there she began a 20-year relationship with a “rich Southern widower“ named Bill Tuckwiller. In 2008, she self-published her first book, Walkabout Dancer, an account of her life.

In September 2013, after Tuckwiller's death, Kramer returned to Australia at the age of 99 because she missed the kookaburras and the smell of gum trees. In 2014, to mark turning 100, she crowdfunded, choreographed, and performed a dance piece called "The Early Ones". In 2015, she was nominated as one of the 100 Women of Influence Awards by The Australian Financial Review and Westpac. In 2017, she created a dance-drama A Buddha's Wife, inspired by her travels in India, part of a wider work celebrating her life, and supported by the Arts Health Institute. A portrait, The inner stillness of Eileen Kramer by plastic surgeon Andrew Lloyd Greensmith, was a finalist for the Archibald Prize in 2017. In 2017, a portrait of her by filmmaker Sue Healey was a finalist in the Digital Portrait Prize (National Portrait Gallery, Canberra) and a finalist in the Blake Prize (Casula Powerhouse, Sydney) in 2018. Healey was also awarded the Australian Dance Award for Outstanding Achievement in Film or New media. Her co-written memoir, Eileen: Stories from the Phillip Street Courtyard, was published in November 2018. In December 2018, she was a guest on ABC's One Plus One programme. In 2019, she entered a self-portrait for the Archibald Prize, becoming the award's oldest ever contributor.

In 2022, she  made a video when dancing on a chair on music of David Orlowsky and David Bergmüller.

Personal life
Kramer never married nor had any children. Her first relationship was with Richard Want, her psychoanalyst, in 1936. She also had a romance with a French diplomat while in India. Kramer later had two extended relationships while living abroad, with Baruch Shadmi (1920 - 1987) and William "Bill" D. Tuckwiller.

Bibliography
 2008, Walkabout Dancer
 2018 (with Tracey Spring), Eileen: Stories from the Phillip Street Courtyard

Filmography
 2017, Eileen - short film by Sue Healey
 2020, The Witch of Kings Cros as Herself (Documentary)
 2020, The End as Rita (Episode: "Blood Sandwich")
 2022, Eileen (video music) as the Dancer

References

External links 
 One Plus One - ABC News
 The Art of Now: Breath is Life - Eileen Kramer - BBC Radio 4
 Studio 10 interview - YouTube

1914 births
Living people
Australian female dancers
Australian choreographers
Australian centenarians
Women centenarians
Writers from Sydney
People from Lewisburg, West Virginia